John Alexander Sampson (23 January 1908 – 15 January 2001) was an Australian rules footballer who played with Footscray in the Victorian Football League (VFL).

Family
The son of John Sampson (1884–1942) and Grace Ivy Sampson, nee Birch (1884–1954), John Alexander Sampson was born at Rupanyup on 23 January 1908. He was the older brother of fellow Footscray player Alf Sampson.

War service
Sampson later served in the Royal Australian Air Force during World War II.

Death
Sampson died on 15 January 2001 and was cremated at Fawkner Memorial Park.

Notes

External links 

1908 births
2001 deaths
Australian rules footballers from Victoria (Australia)
Western Bulldogs players